A gender flip is when a fictional character is created to have a different sex in another setting or in an adaptation of a work. The Internet meme Rule 63 predicts the prevalence of this.

Notable examples 
 Sherlock Holmes's companion Dr. John H. Watson (male) are in some adaptations changed to Joan Watson (female) Elementary (2012 TV-series) or as Jane Watson (female) in The Return of Sherlock Holmes (1987 film)
 Foundation (1951 novel) character Gaal Dornick was changed to Gall Dornick (female) in Foundation (2021 TV-series)
 Starship Troopers (1959 novel) character Dizzy Flores (male) was changed to Dizzy Flores (female) in Starship Troopers (1997 film)
 Dune (1965 novel) character Liet-Kynes (male) was changed to Liet-Kynes (female) in Dune (2021 film)
 Bedazzled (1967 film) character the Devil (male) was changed to the Devil (female) in Bedazzled (2000 film) 
 The Wicker Man (1973 film) character Lord Summerisle (male) was changed to Sister Summersisle (female) in The Wicker Man (2006 film)
 12 Monkeys (1995 film) character Jeffrey Goines (male) was changed to Jennifer Goines (female) in 12 Monkeys (2015 TV-series)

See also 
 Rule 63 an Internet meme that states that, as a rule, "for every given male character, there is a female version of that character" and vice versa.
 Cross-gender acting, when actors or actresses portray a character of the opposite sex

References 

Gender roles